The 1946 Texas Mines Miners football team was an American football team that represented the Texas School of Mines (now known as the University of Texas at El Paso) as a member of the Border Conference during the 1946 college football season. In its first season under head coach Jack Curtice, the team compiled a 3–6 record (2–4 against Border Conference opponents), finished seventh in the conference, and was outscored by a total of 150 to 136.

Schedule

References

Texas Mines
UTEP Miners football seasons
Texas Mines Miners football